
Gmina Zabierzów is a rural gmina (administrative district) in Kraków County, Lesser Poland Voivodeship, in southern Poland.

The gmina contains part of the protected area called Kraków Valleys Landscape Park.

Villages
Gmina Zabierzów contains the villages and settlements of Aleksandrowice, Balice, Bolechowice, Brzezie, Brzezinka, Brzoskwinia, Burów, Karniowice, Kleszczów, Kobylany, Kochanów, Młynka, Niegoszowice, Nielepice, Pisary, Radwanowice, Rudawa, Rząska, Szczyglice, Ujazd, Więckowice, Zabierzów and Zelków.

Neighbouring gminas
Gmina Zabierzów is bordered by the city of Kraków and by the gminas of Jerzmanowice-Przeginia, Krzeszowice, Liszki and Wielka Wieś.

Coat of arms
Blazon: a Modern French shield per pale gules and azure, on the first a griffon segreant argent armed, beaked and langued Or, on the second a human figure fully armoured argent holding a heater shield gules charged with two labels Or of three points arranged in pale.

References
Polish official population figures 2006

Zabierzow
Kraków County